Sergey Grigoryevich Glinkin (2 October 1921 — 25 October 2003) was a Soviet fighter pilot during World War II. Awarded the title Hero of the Soviet Union on 4 February 1944 for his initial victories, by the end of the war his tally reached 30 solo shootdowns, in addition to one shared kill and an aerostat.

References 

1921 births
2003 deaths
Soviet World War II flying aces
Heroes of the Soviet Union
Recipients of the Order of Lenin
Recipients of the Order of the Red Banner
Recipients of the Order of Alexander Nevsky
Recipients of the Order of the Red Star